The 1999–2000 Scottish Cup was the 115th staging of Scotland's most prestigious football knockout competition, also known for sponsorship reasons as the Tennent's Scottish Cup. The Cup was won by Rangers who defeated Aberdeen 4–0 in the final.

First round

Replays

Second round

Replays

Third round

Replays

Fourth round

Replays

Quarter-finals

Semi-finals

Final

See also

Scottish Cup seasons
1999–2000 in Scottish football
Scot